"Sink to the Bottom" is the second single by Fountains of Wayne, from their eponymous debut album. It was released in 1997 and charted in the UK at No. 42 on May 10, 1997. It also reached No. 7 in Norway in 1998.

The two other tracks on the single – "Kid Gloves" and the live version of "Can't Get It Out of My Head" – were unavailable on any Fountains of Wayne album until the release of Out-of-State Plates in 2005. 

The song was used on How I Met Your Mother, in the episode "Atlantic City" and as closing song on The Marvelous Mrs. Maisel, in the episode 7 "Marvelous Radio".

Track listing (CD single)
All tracks composed by Chris Collingwood and Adam Schlesinger except where stated:
"Sink to the Bottom" – 3:12
"Can't Get It Out of My Head" (live) (Jeff Lynne) – 3:52
"Kid Gloves" – 3:31

Track 2 was recorded at the Jacksonville Coliseum, Jacksonville, Florida on February 2, 1997.

Credits
Chris Collingwood – vocals, guitar, keyboards
Adam Schlesinger – vocals, guitar, keyboards, drums; bass guitar (track 2)
Danny Weinkauf – bass guitar (tracks 1 & 3)
Jody Porter – lead guitar, backing vocals (track 2)
Brian Young – drums (track 2)
Engineered by Gary Maurer
Mixed by Adam Schlesinger, Gary Maurer (track 1); Chris Shaw, Eric Tew (track 3)
Mastered by Greg Calbi
Recorded in January and April 1996 at The Place, New York City (tracks 1 & 3)
Mixed at Greene Street Recording, New York City
Mastered at Masterdisk, New York City

References

Fountains of Wayne songs
1997 singles
Songs written by Adam Schlesinger
1996 songs
Songs written by Chris Collingwood
Music videos directed by Chris Applebaum